

107001–107100 

|-id=052
| 107052 Aquincum || 2001 AQ || Aquincum, one of the northernmost Roman garrisons of the first through fourth centuries in central Europe, where now stands Óbuda, part of modern Budapest (this minor planet honours the Council of Óbuda for endorsing Hungarian amateur astronomy) || 
|-id=054
| 107054 Daniela ||  || Daniela Rapavá (born 1956) is a Slovak astronomer who is a popularizer of the natural sciences, including ecological science. She creates beautiful and unusual photography of physical phenomena, and is the founder of The Inventive Astropark at Rimavská Sobota Observatory. || 
|-id=074
| 107074 Ansonsylva ||  || Anson J. Sylva (born 1956), American member of the Air Force Maui Optical and Supercomputing (AMOS) team || 
|}

107101–107200 

|-bgcolor=#f2f2f2
| colspan=4 align=center | 
|}

107201–107300 

|-id=223
| 107223 Ripero ||  || José Ripero (born 1955), Spanish amateur astronomer, co-founder of the M 1 observers group and president of the Centro Astronomico de Ávila, author of El Vigía del Cosmos || 
|}

107301–107400 

|-id=379
| 107379 Johnlogan ||  || John Logan (born 1961) is a highly acclaimed and award-winning writer of fiction and screenplays. Among his many successes are Gladiator, The Last Samurai and Penny Dreadful, each expertly probing the essence of the nature of humans. || 
|-id=393
| 107393 Bernacca ||  || Pier Luigi Bernacca (1940–2013), associate professor of Astronomy, was Director for several years of the PhD School of Space Sciences and Technologies at the University of Padova. || 
|-id=396
| 107396 Swangin || 2001 DU || Gary Swangin (born 1942) is the Planetarium Astronomer and Manager of the Panther Planetarium in Paterson NJ, and was formerly the director of the Newark Museum Planetarium in Newark, NJ. He has produced radio and video materials for public education about astronomy, recombinant DNA and other topics, and been nominated for a Peabody Award. || 
|}

107401–107500 

|-bgcolor=#f2f2f2
| colspan=4 align=center | 
|}

107501–107600 

|-bgcolor=#f2f2f2
| colspan=4 align=center | 
|}

107601–107700 

|-id=638
| 107638 Wendyfreedman ||  || Wendy Freedman (born 1957), Canadian-American astronomer, director of the Carnegie Institution's observatories, and project leader for Giant Magellan Telescope || 
|}

107701–107800 

|-bgcolor=#f2f2f2
| colspan=4 align=center | 
|}

107801–107900 

|-id=805
| 107805 Saibi ||  || Saibi Koto-gakko, private high school in Ehime prefecture, Japan || 
|}

107901–108000 

|-bgcolor=#f2f2f2
| colspan=4 align=center | 
|}

References 

107001-108000